Cain Jair Fara (born 6 March 1994) is an Argentine professional footballer who plays as a centre back for Emelec.

Career
Fara began with Rosario Central. On 30 November 2011, Fara joined Juventud Antoniana on loan. He made his debut in December against San Jorge, which was the first of eleven appearances. He terminated his Rosario contract in 2017, before joining Primera B Metropolitana's Estudiantes. Fara scored his first senior goal during a match against Tristán Suárez on 4 November. Two further goals came as Estudiantes placed second. On 2 July 2018, Fara moved to Primera B Nacional with Ferro Carril Oeste. He was sent off in his sixth game, which was his fifth career red card in just forty-three fixtures.

Career statistics
.

References

External links

1994 births
Living people
Footballers from Rosario, Santa Fe
Argentine footballers
Association football defenders
Torneo Federal A players
Primera B Metropolitana players
Primera Nacional players
Juventud Antoniana footballers
Estudiantes de Buenos Aires footballers
Ferro Carril Oeste footballers
Aldosivi footballers